Boris Becker was the defending champion but did not compete that year.

Tim Mayotte won in the final 2–6, 6–3, 7–5, 6–7, 6–3 against Brad Gilbert.

Seeds
A champion seed is indicated in bold text while text in italics indicates the round in which that seed was eliminated.

  Miloslav Mečíř (second round)
  Pat Cash (quarterfinals)
  Yannick Noah (quarterfinals)
  Andrés Gómez (first round)
  Tim Mayotte (champion)
  Martín Jaite (first round)
  Brad Gilbert (final)
  David Pate (first round)

Draw

Final

Section 1

Section 2

External links
 1987 Paris Open draw

Singles